Carol Cecilia Bown Sepúlveda (born 30 September 1978) is a Chilean lawyer who was elected as a member of the Chilean Constitutional Convention.

During part of the second government of Sebastián Piñera (2018−2022), she was Undersecretary for Childhood, institution linked to the Social Development Minister.

References

External links
 

Living people
1978 births
Chilean women lawyers
21st-century Chilean politicians
Independent Democratic Union politicians
Pontifical Catholic University of Chile alumni
Georgetown University alumni
Members of the Chilean Constitutional Convention
People from Santiago